Lynette Narkle, (born 1946) is an Australian indigenous theatre and film actor and director.

Education
Narkle studied Theatre and Drama from 2002 at Murdoch University in Perth.

Career
Narkle started in theatre in 1979, with indigenous playwright Jack Davis.
Narkle worked for Screenwest increasing the engagement of Indigenous filmmakers with screen culture and was an associate director at Yirra Yaakin Theatre Company from 2002 to 2006.
Narkle was on the Board of the Australia Council for the Arts Aboriginal and Torres Strait Islander Arts Board from 2008 to 2010.
Narkle was on the Board of the Yirra Yaakin Aboriginal Corporation from 2003 to 2007 and a WA representative on the Australia Council for the Arts Community Cultural Development Fund from 1996 to 1999.

Personal
Narkle, a Noongar woman, was born in Wagin, Western Australia in 1946. Narkle has three sons and two daughters.

Honours and awards
 2017 Red Ochre Award, Australia Council for the Arts
 2018 Honorary Doctor of Arts, Edith Cowan University

Theatre

Filmography

References

External links

Living people
1946 births
20th-century Australian actresses
21st-century Australian actresses
Actresses from Western Australia
Australian film actresses
Australian stage actresses
Australian theatre directors
Indigenous Australian actresses
Murdoch University alumni
Noongar people
Women theatre directors